Frank Pierce Berkelbach  (July 27, 1853 – June 10, 1932) was an American professional baseball player who played outfielder for the 1884 Cincinnati Red Stockings.

External links

Baseball players from Philadelphia
Cincinnati Red Stockings (AA) players
19th-century baseball players
1853 births
1932 deaths
Major League Baseball outfielders
Philadelphia Athletics (minor league) players
Camden Merritts players
Chester Blue Stockings players
Littlestown (minor league baseball) players